Hailu Ebba (born 12 December 1950) is an Ethiopian middle-distance runner. He competed in the men's 1500 metres at the 1972 Summer Olympics.

References

1950 births
Living people
Athletes (track and field) at the 1972 Summer Olympics
Ethiopian male middle-distance runners
Olympic athletes of Ethiopia
Place of birth missing (living people)